Jon Kammerer Guitars is an American manufacturer of acoustic and electric guitars and basses, founded in 1999 by Jon Kammerer.  The first Jon Kammerer guitars were acoustic, featuring an innovative, patented parabolic design that increases structural strength and durability, yet maintains tonal projection while reducing the size/weight of traditional acoustic guitars.  Electric models followed, including full-sized and downsized solid-bodies, chambered (w/ f-hole), semi-hollow-body, and hollow-body models using similar rounded design cues based on parabolic arcs.

Chad Gilpin joined the Jon Kammerer Guitars team after designing and patenting an acoustic guitar soundhole that eliminates feedback when the guitar is amplified.

History

After completing honorable service in the US Army, Jon attended Southern Illinois University at Carbondale and studied Design. Needing an original thesis project to graduate, he decided to build a guitar using new design ideas. After graduation his concept kept evolving. While working as a prototype model maker, he tried a variety of ideas before settling on the design that became his patented acoustic guitar in 2000.

Jon Kammerer Guitars also produces necks for both Birdsong Basses and Tranjo travel banjos.

Innovations

While most companies use CNC for cheap mass production, Jon Kammerer Guitars uses the technology for artistry, as well as to increase quality and standardization.  Dramatic examples of this technical application are the puzzle-top guitars, including his flag and camouflage guitars.

Jon Kammerer Guitars is one of the few guitar companies that takes the time to do blind fret slots.  This increases the build complexity, as the guitar builder must take care to not cut the fret slot all the way across the fretboard.  This process ensures that the fret tang does not stick out if the wood shrinks as it ages, but without having to resort to plastic binding along the fretboard edge.

Jon Kammerer Guitars emphasizes customization of many guitar options as included in the standard price.  This allows a customer to personalize the guitar he wants to an unprecedented degree at no additional cost.  Features available for no-cost custom choices include hardware color, fretboard material, fretboard radius, body wood, stain finish color, fret marker inlay material, neck carve, left-handed versions of any model, choice of pickup configuration, and electronic switching options.

Each Neck is held on by 4 large (1/4 20) machine bolts countersunk through an aluminum plate and threading into brass inserts that have been screwed into the base of the neck. Necks are located by hardened steel locating pins to maintain proper scale length and neck alignment.

References 
 Brief history of Jon Kammerer Guitars
 7MB Windows Media Video of Jon Kammerer Mini-Semi-Hollow-Body Guitar
 11.1MB Windows Media Video introduction to Jon Kammerer Guitars

External links 
 Official site of Jon Kammerer Guitars
 Company profile
 Gear Wire Interview with Jon Kammerer
 Gear Wire Feature of guitar builder Jon Kammerer

Reviews/Testimonials
 Harmony Central Forum discussion
 Musician's Hotline Review of Jon Kammerer Solidbody Electric

Guitar manufacturing companies of the United States